P.O.W. is a television series consisting of 6 episodes, broadcast on ITV in 2003. The series starred James D'Arcy and Joe Absolom. The drama series is based on true stories, set in Germany in the year 1940 and follows the character of Jim Caddon as he is captured after his plane crashes during a bombing raid over Normandy. In contrast to previous entries in the World War Two prison escape genre such as The Colditz Story, it concentrated on escape attempts by other ranks rather than officers. The title "P.O.W." stands for "prisoner of war".

A second series has not been commissioned, though ITV followed it with several other World War Two dramas including Colditz and Island at War.

Cast 
 James D'Arcy as Jim Caddon
 Joe Absolom as Drew Pritchard
 Anatole Taubman as Kommandant Dreiber
 Shaun Dooley as Brown
 Ewan Stewart as John Stevens
 Craig Heaney as Larry Boyd
 Patrick Baladi as Captain Attercombe
 Sam Spruell as Wilkes
 Amelia Curtis as Alice Dreiber

Episodes

Production
The series was filmed in Lithuania and first broadcast on television on 10 October 2003.

Home release 
After the series aired it was released on DVD, by Acorn Media UK, containing the following extras:
 Production notes
 Picture gallery
 Interactive menus
 Scene selection
 P.O.W. Hooch recipe
 Cast filmographies
 P.O.W. slang dictionary

References

External links 
 

2003 British television series debuts
2003 British television series endings
2000s British drama television series
ITV television dramas
World War II television series
2000s British television miniseries
Television series by All3Media
English-language television shows
Prisoners of war in popular culture